Eller is a river of Lower Saxony and Thuringia, Germany.

Its source is the confluence of the Weilroder Eller and the Geroder Eller. It flows into the Rhume in Rüdershausen.

See also
List of rivers of Lower Saxony
List of rivers of Thuringia

Rivers of Lower Saxony
Rivers of Thuringia
Rivers of Germany